Kota Shahbandar is a small town in Rompin District, Pahang, Malaysia. Malaysia Federal Route 11 passes through the town.

References

Rompin District
Towns in Pahang